Marcus Scott Chong (né Wyatt; born July 8, 1967) is an American actor. He is known for playing Miguel Mendez in the short-lived crime drama, Street Justice (1991–1993), real-life activist Huey P. Newton in Panther (1995), directed by Mario Van Peebles, and most notably, Tank in The Matrix (1999), directed by The Wachowskis.

Early life
Chong was born in Seattle on July 8, 1967, to an African-American father and a Chinese mother. His biological father, Martin Wyatt, was a sports reporter in San Francisco for KGO-TV. He was adopted by Tommy and Shelby Chong in 1978.

Career
Chong began acting at age nine. His first role was portraying the young Frankie Warner in the 1979 miniseries Roots: The Next Generations (1979). He was a guest star in Little House on the Prairie, in "Blind Journey: Part 2".

Chong originated the role of student Lee Cortez in the Broadway production of Stand-Up Tragedy, written by Bill Cain which opened at the Criterion Center Stage Right and closed in October 1990 after 13 performances. The short-lived role nevertheless earned him a 1991 Theatre World Award; he was also nominated Drama Desk Award for Outstanding Featured Actor in a Play.

In the early 1990s, Chong played the recurring character Miguel Mendez on the TV show Street Justice from 1991 to 1993. By 1994, he later appeared in the Vanishing Son action series as Fu Qua Johnson alongside many actors of Asian descent. In 1995 appeared in Temptations music video, with Coolio, Ice-T and Jada Pinkett Smith.

In 1999, Chong appeared as Tank in The Matrix. Throughout the 2000s decade and briefly the 2010s, Chong has appeared in popular TV shows in supporting guest roles. In 2001, he appeared in the third season of the TV series Law & Order: Special Victims Unit and in 2002, appeared in the first season of Law & Order: Criminal Intent. In 2009, he appeared in the sixth season of Numb3rs and in 2010, he had a role in the fourth season of Burn Notice.

Chong's last feature film role was in the 2005 movie The Crow: Wicked Prayer as a character named War. The film was released briefly in theaters in Chong's hometown of Seattle, Washington. Following this, he's appeared in multiple short films: "Concrete River" (2009), "Son Shine" (2013), and "Not 4 Sale" (2013); the latter in which he plays legendary actor Harry Belafonte. Following the last short film Not 4 Sale, Chong has had no acting roles since.

The Matrix controversy
In May 2003, Chong filed a lawsuit at Los Angeles County Superior Court against Warner Bros and AOL Time Warner, saying Warner was in breach of a 1998 verbal agreement, and a 2000 contract to continue the character of Tank in the film's two sequels. Chong was offered $250,000 to appear in both The Matrix Reloaded and The Matrix Revolutions; that is for both movies, not per. Apparently, he wanted twice the amount (plus bonuses and guarantees he would be invited to press junkets and premieres) or he would do it for free. When the Wachowskis rejected his demands, Chong was arrested in October 2000 for allegedly making threatening phone calls to the filmmakers. In his suit, Chong claimed he had since been blackballed from Hollywood and blamed The Matrix creators and Warner Bros. for branding him a “terrorist.”

In 2016, Chong did a radio interview with Blog Talk Radio going into detail regarding behind-the-scenes issues during production of The Matrix and instances that occurred afterwards where he felt he was treated unfairly.

In 2018, he released a documentary "The Marcus Chong Story" on his YouTube channels (under the names "Marcus Wyatt" and "Marcus Chong"), detailing his life and the issues he's faced working with actor C. Thomas Howell on the direct-to-video movie Pure Danger (1996) and during production of The Matrix in 1998.

Filmography

Film

Television

References

External links 
 

1967 births
Living people
20th-century American male actors
21st-century American male actors
African-American male actors
American male film actors
American male television actors
American people of Chinese descent
Male actors from Seattle
20th-century African-American people
African American adoptees